Manuru is a village in Eluru district of the Indian state of Andhra Pradesh. It is located in Eluru mandal of Eluru revenue division.

Demographics 

 Census of India, Manuru had a population of 927. The total population constitute, 462 males and 465 females with a sex ratio of 1006 females per 1000 males. 116 children are in the age group of 0–6 years with child sex ratio of 871 girls per 1000 boys. The average literacy rate stands at 58.57 %.

References

External links

Villages in Eluru district